Casey James Clausen (born January 9, 1981) is an American football coach and former player. He is the head football coach of Bishop Alemany High School in Los Angeles, California.  Clausen played college football at the University of Tennessee and professionally in NFL Europe (NFLE). He attended Bishop Alemany.

Clausen the older brother of former quarterback Jimmy Clausen and Rick Clausen.

College career
Clausen attended and played college football at the University of Tennessee under head coach Phillip Fulmer from 2000–2003. Clausen took over the starting position from A. J. Suggs on October 21, 2000, in the annual rivalry game against Alabama. He helped lead Tennessee to the SEC East Division title in 2001. He started 44 of 47 games at the quarterback position in his career and had a 14–1 record on the road with a 34–10 record overall.

College statistics

Professional career

Kansas City Chiefs
Clausen went undrafted in the 2004 NFL Draft and was briefly signed by the Kansas City Chiefs as a free agent.

Amsterdam Admirals
In 2005, Clausen spent some time with the Amsterdam Admirals of NFL Europe.

Coaching career
Clausen was hired as the Calabasas High School's head football coach on December 12, 2013. On December 16, 2017, Clausen was hired as head football coach at his alma mater, Bishop Alemany High School.

References

1981 births
Living people
American football quarterbacks
Tennessee Volunteers football players
High school football coaches in California
People from Thousand Oaks, California
Sportspeople from Ventura County, California
Players of American football from California